The 2005 Eneco Tour of Benelux road cycling race took place from August 3 to August 10. The Eneco tour is the continuation of the Tour of the Netherlands. This first edition covered parts of the Netherlands, Belgium and Germany. 184 cyclists and 23 cycling teams participated. 20 are UCI ProTour teams, the three remaining are Shimano Memory-Corp and the Belgian teams MrBookmaker and Chocolade Jacques. The winner, Bobby Julich, won the last stage, an individual time trial with a time of 31'14". This launched him from the twelfth place 12 to the first. Leif Hoste, thirteenth, became second. Max van Heeswijk (DSC) wore the red jersey two days (the 2nd and the 3rd) and Rik Verbrugghe five days.

This edition was somewhat tainted by an incident during stage 4. Near Stavelot, the peloton were sent in the wrong direction, while the handful of men ahead were on the correct course. As a result, their lead grew to about 15 minutes, which would have made it nearly impossible for anyone else to attain the overall victory, destroying the appeal of the race. The jury decided that the leaders would have to halt until the peloton's lag was reduced to what it was before, but they initially refused. Eventually, they had to be halted by the police, causing leader Bart Dockx to sit on the ground by way of protest.

In the final time trial, Bobby Julich climbed from 12th to 1st overall.

Stages

03-08-2005: Mechelen, 5.7 km. (ITT)

04-08-2005: Geel-Mierlo, 189 km.

05-08-2005: Geldrop-Sittard, 178 km.

06-08-2005: Beek-Landgraaf, 205 km.

07-08-2005: Landgraaf-Verviers, 232 km.

08-08-2005: Verviers-Hasselt, 194 km.

09-08-2005: Sint Truiden-Hoogstraten, 195 km.

10-08-2005: Etten-Leur, 26 km. (ITT)

General Standings

KOM Classification

Points Classification

Best Young Rider

Best Team

External links
Race website

2005 UCI ProTour
Eneco
Eneco
Eneco
2005